Max Holdo (born 9 March 1971) is an Argentine former rower. He competed in the men's double sculls event at the 1992 Summer Olympics.

References

External links
 

1971 births
Living people
Argentine male rowers
Olympic rowers of Argentina
Rowers at the 1992 Summer Olympics
Place of birth missing (living people)
Pan American Games medalists in rowing
Pan American Games bronze medalists for Argentina
Rowers at the 1991 Pan American Games
Medalists at the 1991 Pan American Games
20th-century Argentine people